Hamilton Lea is a village and civil parish on the edge of Leicester, Leicestershire, England. It is a part of the more recent Hamilton development, which spilled over the boundary with the city of Leicester into the Borough of Charnwood around Catteric Way and the northern stretches of Laverton Road and Hackness Road.

Governance
As of 2021, the parish has not elected a parish council and is instead governed by a parish meeting that all registered electors in the parish can attend.

References

External links
 Hamilton Lea Parish Meeting

Villages in Leicestershire
Civil parishes in Leicestershire
Borough of Charnwood